Yankee is a 1966 Italian-Spanish Western film directed by Tinto Brass and starring Philippe Leroy.

Plot
Local crime boss El Grande Concho rules with his gang from an abandoned church over a big territory. Hoping for a substantial payday a bounty hunter called "Yankee" decides to take him on.

Cast
 Philippe Leroy - Yankee
 Adolfo Celi - Grande Concho
 Mirella Martin - Rosita
 Tomás Torres - Luiz
 Francisco Sanz - Consalvo (as Paco Sanz)
 Franco De Rosa - Angelface
 Víctor Israel - the sheriff
 Pasquale Basile - Denti d'oro
 Jacques Herlin - Filosofo
 Giorgio Bret Schneider - Pittore
 Antonio Basile - Tatuato
 Renzo Pevarello - the Portuguese
 César Ojinaga - the deputy sheriff (as Caesar Ojinaga)
 Valentino Macchi - Garcia
 Tomas Milton - Tom
 Henriquetta Senalada (as Enriquetta Señalada)
 Jose Halufi - Perro (as José Jalufi)

References

External links

1966 films
1960s Italian-language films
1966 Western (genre) films
Films directed by Tinto Brass
Spaghetti Western films
1960s Italian films
Films shot in Aragon